Geoffrey Charles Ford (born 26 September 1961) is a former English cricketer.  Ford was a right-handed batsman who bowled right-arm medium pace.  He was born in Oxford, Oxfordshire.

Ford made his debut for Oxfordshire in the 1983 Minor Counties Championship against Cheshire.  Ford played Minor counties cricket for Oxfordshire from 1983 to 1992, which included 42 Minor Counties Championship matches and 17 MCCA Knockout Trophy matches.  He made his List A debut against Warwickshire in the 1984 NatWest Trophy.  He played 7 further List A matches, the last coming against Surrey in the 1991 NatWest Trophy.  In his 7 List A matches, he scored 187 runs at a batting average of 26.71, with a high score of 62.  This came against Warwickshire in his first List A match, with his innings being ended by Alvin Kallicharran.

References

External links
Geoffrey Ford at ESPNcricinfo
Geoffrey Ford at CricketArchive

1961 births
Living people
Cricketers from Oxford
English cricketers
Oxfordshire cricketers